Darrin Bell (born January 27, 1975) is a Pulitzer Prize-winning American editorial cartoonist and comic strip creator known for the syndicated comic strips Candorville and Rudy Park. He is a syndicated editorial cartoonist with King Features. (His editorial cartoons were formally syndicated by The Washington Post Writers Group.)

Bell is the first African-American to have two comic strips syndicated nationally. He is also a storyboard artist. Bell engages in issues such as civil rights, pop culture, family, science fiction, scriptural wisdom, and nihilist philosophy, while often casting his characters in roles that are traditionally denied them.

Biography 
Bell, who is black and Jewish, was born in Los Angeles, California. He started drawing when he was three. He attended the University of California, Berkeley, graduating with a BA in Political Science in 1999. While at Cal, Bell became the editorial cartoonist for The Daily Californian. Bell's freelance editorial cartooning career began in 1995 at age 20. His first sale was to the Los Angeles Times, which subsequently assigned him a cartoon every other week. Bell also sold his cartoons to the San Francisco Chronicle and the former BANG (Bay Area News Group) papers, which included the Oakland Tribune.

Bell's strip Candorville, launched in September 2003 by The Washington Post Writers Group, features young black and Latino characters living in the inner city. Using the vehicle of humor, Candorville presents social and political commentary as well as the stories of its protagonists. Candorville grew out of a comic strip called Lemont Brown, which appeared in the student newspaper of UC Berkeley, The Daily Californian, from 1993 to 2003. It was that newspaper's longest-running comic strip. Candorville appears in over 100 of America's newspapers.

Bell also drew Rudy Park, a syndicated comic strip created by Theron Heir and Bell that was distributed by United Features Syndicate and then The Washington Post Writers Group. Heir, a.k.a. Matt Richtel, wrote the strip from 2001 to 2012, when he announced he was taking a year-long sabbatical to focus on other projects. Bell at that point took over the writing duties as well as illustrating the strip, which ended in June 2018.

Personal life 
Bell currently resides in Los Angeles, California.

Awards 
Bell was given the 2019 Pulitzer Prize for Editorial Cartooning. In addition to the awards listed below, Bell's work won several California Intercollegiate Press Association awards and an SPJ Mark of Excellence Award, and he was a two-time runner-up for the Charles M. Schulz Award, as well as a runner-up for the Locher Award.

 2015 Robert F. Kennedy Journalism Award for Editorial Cartooning
 2016 Clifford K. & James T. Berryman Award for Editorial Cartoons
 2019 Pulitzer Prize for Editorial Cartooning

Publications

Interviews
Interview with Tony Dokoupil, Newsweek (January 19, 2008)
Interview with Comics Coast to Coast (April 28, 2008)
Interview with Michael A. Ventrella (August 2011)
Interview with Michael Cavna, The Washington Post (August 20, 2014)
Interview with Michael Cavna, The Washington Post (December 4, 2014)

References

External links
 Editorial Cartoons Official Site
 Candorville Official Site

1975 births
Living people
African-American comics creators
American comics creators
American comic strip cartoonists
American comics artists
UC Berkeley College of Letters and Science alumni
African-American artists
African-American Jews
Artists from Los Angeles
Jewish American artists
The New Yorker people
21st-century African-American people
21st-century American Jews
20th-century African-American people